Bohuslavice is a municipality and village in Šumperk District in the Olomouc Region of the Czech Republic. It has about 500 inhabitants.

Etymology
The name is derived from the personal name Bohuslav. According to a legend, it was a fisherman who managed the ponds belonging to the nobility and for his services was commissioned to establish a village.

Geography
It lies in the Mohelnice Depression. Bohuslavice is situated in a floodplain of the Morava River. The Morava partially forms the western border of the municipality.

History
The first written mention of Bohuslavice is from 1356. The village was founded in around 1250. The population was purely Czech, without German minority. In the 15th century, a set of fish ponds was created here.

Bohuslavice was completely destroyed during the Thirty Years' War. After the war, the village was resettled, again only by Czechs. In the mid-19th century, the set of ponds was dissolved.

The municipality was ceded to Nazi Germany after the Munich Agreement, and incorporated into the Reichsgau Sudetenland, even though the village was entirely ethnically Czech.

Bohuslavice suffered several major floods in the 19th and 20th century, including the 1997 Central European flood.

Sights
The Chapel of Saints Peter and Paul dates from the second half of the 19th century.

References

External links

Villages in Šumperk District